The Mazda MX-3 is a four-seat coupé front wheel drive manufactured and marketed by Mazda, introduced at the Geneva Auto Show in March 1991 and marketed for model years 1992–1998.

The MX-3 was also marketed as the Mazda MX-3 Precidia in Canada and as the Eunos Presso, Autozam AZ-3 and Mazda AZ-3 in Japan. In Australia it was marketed as the Eunos 30X until late 1996 when it became the Mazda-Eunos 30X.

History
The MX-3's platform is called the EC platform, and shares much with the BG platform of the contemporary Familia/323/Protegé. The first model year was available in Japan, Europe, Australia, and North America where it went on sale in September 1991, as a 1992. Originally available with a single-cam 1.6-liter inline-four or the 1.8 liter  twin-cam V6, a few more engines were available as development continued. In the summer of 1991, the Autozam AZ-3 was added to the Japanese market lineup. It was known by two names;"Autozam" was meant to be Mazda's more youthful brand, so it combined a somewhat lower price with a sportier (but smaller) twin-cam 1.5L 4 cylinder engine, and also sold as the Eunos Presso, a companion, affordable sports hatchback to the Eunos Roadster.

The small displacement V6 was offered to comply with Japanese government regulations concerning exterior dimensions and engine displacement; Japanese buyers were liable for annual taxes for vehicles exceeding the regulations and large displacement engines, which would affect sales. Japanese buyers who were willing to pay the tax for larger vehicles were now given a choice of the FC series Mazda RX-7 and the JC series Mazda Cosmo.

In January 1994, a DOHC version of the familiar B6 engine, the B6D, replaced the previous version. This provided a useful power increase but conversely also made the considerably more expensive V6 version less desirable. Sales of the V6 in the United States market came to an end after the 1994 model year, although they continued in Canada, Japan and many other export markets. While called K8-DE in North American specs, Japanese and other markets received an engine called the K8-ZE. Aside from emissions equipment and varying power claims due to myriad ratings methods, the differences are negligible.

The MX-3 was only manufactured for one generation as the MX-5 proved more popular and as the Japanese asset price bubble effects became noticeable, Mazda had to cut back models that weren't selling well and the MX-3 was cancelled.

Performance

With a turning rate of 0.89 g (8.7 m/s²), its handling capabilities were among the best in its class. 

The V6 engine belonged to the Mazda K-series, which were used in a range of Mazda vehicles. These engines use a Variable Length Intake Manifold (VLIM), in order to provide optimal torque using intake resonance. Mazda called their system on the MX-3 the "Variable Resonance Induction System" (VRIS). This engine had a 7,000 rpm redline, and a 7,800 rpm fuel cutoff.

For the rear suspension of the MX-3, Mazda used its proprietary Twin-Trapezoidal Link (TTL) technology, delivering benefits associated with active four-wheel steering systems while lighter and less mechanically complicated. Twin-Trapezoidal Link technology has been used on a range of other Mazda vehicles before and since the MX-3.

Models and specifications

Models (North America)
 RS • 1992-1996
 GS • 1992-1994 (Canada until 1995)

Engines

Special editions

In 1993, Mazda Canada offered a limited special edition model of its Mazda MX-3 GS to celebrate the company's 25th year in Canada. At the same time, Mazda USA offered a similar model in a special edition as well. Only a total of 2,000 were supposedly made. The special edition MX-3 featured the V6 engine, leather interior (including seats, steering wheel and shift knob), heated seats (Canada only), and custom Enkei manufactured 15 inch alloy wheels. Most special edition models came in the color "raspberry metallic"; however, there was also "blaze" red, "brilliant" black, and "laguna" blue.

In 1993, Mazda Europe produced 100 Mazda MX-3 V6 SEs. These had a leather and suede interior, and all had the clear white body color. There were also a limited number of Mazda MX-3 V6 Equipes, with "sparkle green metallic" or "noble" green exteriors.

Modifications

The MX-3 is becoming a rare car, so modifications for it can be difficult to find unless one knows where to look, since it has not been sold in North America since 1997. Since the MX-3 has two engine classes, I4 and V6, many of the engine performance modifications are dependent upon what platform is installed.

There is now a decent range of body modifications for the MX-3 along with performance brakes and suspension. Most extensive modification must be entirely custom fabricated due to limited availability.

RS

The MX-3 RS with the four-cylinder engine can upgrade to the BP , B6-T , BP-T  and BPD-T  engines.

Swapping of the four-cylinder RS engines is slightly more complicated than the V6 GS mainly due to ECU, wiring harness, and MAF combinations as well as motor mounts. The V6 swaps require specific ECU, intake manifold, and VAF sensor combinations, but there are far fewer variables to deal with. Many improvements can be made after the engine swap and during the engine tuning process to find the best combination of engine peripherals.

GS
The most common engine swap for MX-3 GS owners with the V6 engine is a 2.5 L V6, either a North American-spec KL-DE , found most commonly in the 1993-1997 Ford Probe GT, the 1993-1997 Mazda MX-6 LS, or the 1993-2002 Mazda 626 LX or ES, and the Japanese-spec KL-ZE , found in such vehicles as the Efini MS-8, Xedos 9, and Eunos 800. A 2.0 L V6 KF-ZE is also available, but this swap is quite difficult due to the unavailability of required components. For this reason, this particular engine swap is not often attempted.
The GS, apart from the engine has dual tip exhaust, a tighter steering ratio, four disc brakes and front and rear spoiler.

References

External links

MX-3.com – Specifications and other details
UK-MX3.com – UK Owners Club

MX-3
Compact cars
Front-wheel-drive sports cars
Sport compact cars
Hatchbacks
Cars introduced in 1991
Cars discontinued in 1998
Coupés